Euthamia graminifolia, the grass-leaved goldenrod or flat-top goldentop, is a North American species of plants in the family Asteraceae.

It is native to much of Canada (from Newfoundland to British Columbia), and the northern and eastern United States (primarily the Northeast, the Great Lakes region, and the Ohio Valley, with additional populations in the Southeast, the Great Plains, and a few scattered locations in the Pacific Northwest).
There are also introduced populations in Europe and Asia.

Description
Euthamia graminifolia is a herbaceous plant on thin, branching stems. Leaves are alternate, simple, long and narrow much like grass leaves (hence the name of the species). One plant can produce many small, yellow flower heads flat-topped arrays sometimes as much as 30 cm (1 foot) across. Each head has 7–35 ray florets surrounding 3–13 disc florets. The species is very common in fallow fields, waste places, fencerows, and vacant lots in many places.

References

External links
United States Department of Agriculture Plants Profile for Euthamia graminifolia (flat-top goldentop)
Photo of herbarium specimen at Missouri Botanical Garden, collected in North Carolina in 1897, isotype of Euthamia fastigiata, syn of Euthamia graminifolia

graminifolia
Flora of North America
Plants described in 1753
Taxa named by Carl Linnaeus